The Minister for the Monarchy's Joint Internal Affairs was a short lived ministerial title related to the coordination of the unity of the Realm's joint cases.

History
The Ministry for the Monarchy's Joint Internal Affairs - unofficially called the "Joint Ministry of the Interior" - was established by the Royal proclamation of 16 October 1855. Following this, a number of institutions from the Ministry of Finance was transferred to the ministry, including the Postal Service, and the Colonial Central Board. From the Ministry of the Interior, the new ministry took over cases such as citizenship cases.

The ministry was abolished by Royal proclamation of 1 August 1858, and all its resources were placed under Ministry of Finance.

List of ministers

References

Lists of government ministers of Denmark
Government ministerial offices of Denmark
1966 establishments in Denmark